Pittosporum revolutum, the rough-fruited pittosporum, yellow pittosporum, Brisbane laurel or wild yellow jasmine, is a shrub that is endemic to Australia.
The species grows up to 3 metres in height and has leaves that are 5 to 15 cm long and 1.5 to 6 cm wide. The fragrant, yellow flowers appear in terminal clusters in spring. It occurs in habitats ranging from rainforest to dry sclerophyll forests in Queensland, New South Wales and Victoria.

References

External links
Pittosporum revolutum: Occurrence data from Australasian Virtual Herbarium

Apiales of Australia
Flora of New South Wales
Flora of Queensland
Flora of Victoria (Australia)
revolutum